Stanley 'Stan' Gilligan (1928 - 9 April 2020) was a male former wrestler who competed for England.

Wrestling career
He was a member of the Barton Athletic Club and was a British Welterweight champion. He retired after the 1968 season

He represented England in the -68 kg division at the 1966 British Empire and Commonwealth Games in Kingston, Jamaica.

Personal life
His son Joey Gilligan and his brother Dennis Gilligan were also England international wrestlers. Gilligan died on 9 April 2020 from Covid-19.

References

1928 births
2020 deaths
English male wrestlers
Wrestlers at the 1966 British Empire and Commonwealth Games
Commonwealth Games competitors for England
Sportspeople from Salford